Carters Beach is a suburb of Westport on the West Coast of New Zealand's South Island. From the Buller River jetty at the east end of Carters Beach, west to Cape Foulwind, the beach runs for more than 9 uninterrupted kilometres.

Carters Beach is occasionally used by naturists for nude sunbathing. New Zealand has no official nude beaches, as public nudity is legal on any beach where it is "known to occur".

The Kawatiri Coastal Trail is under construction and was expected to be completed in 2021, since delayed to 2024. The bike trail will connect Westport to Carters Beach, and continue south to Charleston. In Carters Beach, it passes through wetlands, past the golf course, and through the domain (public park) as it winds its way south.

An 18-hole golf course and Westport Airport are located near the town. Erosion along Rotary Road in 2018 resulted in the closure of the beachside road and threatened the possible closure of the nearby airport.  However, in 2020 the road along the beach to the west side of the Buller River mouth was rebuilt as a bike and pedestrian path. Granite rock has been piled along the beach to prevent further erosion and impact to the airport.

The town offers accommodations and a restaurant.

Carters Beach was named after an early settler who farmed the area in the late 1800s.

Demographics

The population of Carters Beach was 330 in the 2018 census, a decrease of 9 from 2013, and an increase of 36 from 2006. There were 177 males and 156 females. 306 people  (92.7%) identified as European/Pākehā, 45 (13.6%) as Māori, 3 (0.9%) as Pacific peoples, and 6 (1.8%) as Asian. 72 people  (21.8%) were under 15 years old, 18 (5.5%) were 15–29, 153 (46.4%) were 30–64, and 87 (26.4%) were over 65.

References 

Buller District
Populated places in the West Coast, New Zealand
Nude beaches
Naturism in New Zealand